Cuonahu railway station, also called Tsonag Lake station, is a station on the Chinese Qinghai–Tibet Railway. The station is located in Amdo County, Nagchu, Tibet Autonomous Region.

Station layout
Tsonag Lake railway stations is located on the eastern shores of Tsonag Lake.

See also

 Qinghai–Tibet Railway
 List of stations on Qinghai–Tibet railway
 Tsonag Lake

References

Railway stations in Tibet
Stations on the Qinghai–Tibet Railway